North Sydney Bus Depot is a bus depot in the Sydney suburb of Neutral Bay operated by Keolis Downer Northern Beaches.

History
On 3 June 1909, the North Sydney Tram Depot opened to replace the Ridge Street Tram Depot. On 15 September 1940, a bus depot opened on the adjacent site. With the closure of the North Sydney tram network in June 1958 and the opening of Willoughby Bus Depot in July 1958, the tram depot closed and sold for redevelopment as the Big Bear Shopping Centre, while the bus depot was downgraded to a satellite depot. In October 2021 it was included in the transfer of region 8 from State Transit to Keolis Downer Northern Beaches.

As of November 2022, it has an allocation of 58 buses.

References

External links
Service NSW

Bus garages
Industrial buildings in Sydney
Neutral Bay, New South Wales
Tram depots in Sydney
Transport infrastructure completed in 1909
1909 establishments in Australia